Chicago Center for Urban Life and Culture is the only nonprofit and independent experiential educational program for college students in the United States.  It was established in the late 1960s as "Urban Life Center" by a group of college professors and college students.  It was incorporated in 1970 and renamed in 2006.  The Chicago Center is distinguished by its experiential seminars characterized by a 'First Voice' pedagogy, its location in the Hyde Park neighborhood of Chicago, and relationships with several hundred internship sites in Chicago.

While many of the students who attend Chicago Center grew up in cities, the majority of participants are from suburban, rural and even farming communities.

In addition to its Semester, May Term and Summer Session, which individual students sign up for, the Chicago Center designs and staffs what it calls "LearnChicago!" programs for groups, which promise non-tourist Chicago experiences.

Mayor Richard M. Daley of the City of Chicago has recognized Chicago Center twice, in 2000 and 2006.  The Chicago Center has received awards from the National Society of Experiential Education and the Midwest Sociological Society.

External links
 Chicago Center for Urban Life and Culture

Chicago Center for Urban Life and Culture